HERC2 is a giant E3 ubiquitin protein ligase, implicated in DNA repair regulation, pigmentation and neurological disorders. It is encoded by a gene of the same name belonging to the HERC family, which typically encodes large protein products with C-terminal HECT domains and one or more RCC1-like (RLD) domains.

History 
HERC2, previously referred to as the rjs gene locus, was first identified in 1990 as the gene responsible for two phenotypes in mice: the runty, jerky, sterile (rjs) phenotype and the juvenile development and fertility-2 (Jdf2) phenotype. Mutant alleles are known to cause hypo-pigmentation and pink eye phenotypes, as well reduced growth, jerky gait, male sterility, female semi-sterility, and maternal behaviour defects in mice.

Gene locus 
The full HERC2 gene is located at 15q13, encoded by 93 exons and its transcription is under the control of a CpG rich promoter. This region on chromosome 15 is susceptible to breaks during chromosomal rearrangement and there are at least 12 partial duplicates of HERC2 between 15q11–15q13.

At least 15 HERC2 SNPs have been identified and they are strongly associated with human iris colour variability, functioning to repress expression of OCA2's product.

Protein structure 
HERC2 encodes a 4834-amino acid protein with a theoretical size of 528 kDa. While a full structure has not yet been elucidated, potentially due to its large size, partial structures of its domains have been captured.

It has an N-terminal bilobed HECT domain, conferring E3 ligase functionality, as well as 3 RLD domains with seven-bladed β-propeller folds. In addition to these HERC family hallmarks, it has several other motifs; a cytochrome-b5-like domain, several potential phosphorylation sites, and a ZZ-type zinc finger motif. This is likely involved in protein binding, and has recently been identified as a SUMOylation target following DNA damage.

Expression of HERC2 is ubiquitous, though particularly high in the brain and testes. Cellular localisation is predominantly to the nucleus and cytoplasm.

Protein function

Pigmentation 
SNPs of HERC2 are strongly associated with iris colour variability in humans. In particular, the rs916977 and rs12913832 SNPs have been reported as good predictors of this trait, and the latter is also significantly associated with skin and hair colour. The ancestral allele is linked to darker pigmentation and dominant over the lighter pigment recessive allele. The rs12913832 SNP, located in intron 86 of the HERC2 gene contains a silencing sequence that can inhibit the expression of OCA2 and, if both recessive alleles are present, can homozygously cause blue eyes. This genotype is present in almost all people with blue eyes and is hypothesised as being the founder mutation of blue eyes in humans.

The rs916977 SNP is most common in Europe; particularly in the north and east, where it nears fixation. The variant is also found at high frequencies in North Africa, the Near East, Oceania and the Americas.

DNA repair pathways 
HERC2 is a component of the replication fork and essential for DNA damage repair pathways. Regulating DNA repair pathways is necessary, as unchecked they can target and excise undamaged DNA, potentially leading to mutation.

It is involved in coordinating the Chk1-directed DNA damage/cell cycle checkpoint response by regulating the stability of the deubiquitination enzyme USP20. Under normal conditions HERC2 associates with USP20 and ubiquitinates it for degradation. Under replication stress, for example a DNA polymerase mismatch error, USP20 disassociates from HERC2 and deubiquitinates claspin, stabilising it to then bind and activate Chk1. This allows for DNA replication to be paused and the error corrected.

At the site of doubles stranded breaks, HERC2 facilitates the binding of RNF8, a RING finger ubiquitin ligase to the E2 ubiquitin-conjugating enzyme UBC13. This association is required for RNF8 mediated Lys-63 poly-ubiquitination signalling, which both recruits and retains repair factors at the site of DNA damage to commence homologous recombination repair.

HERC2 is also involved in regulating nucleotide excision repair by ubiquitinating the XPA repair protein for proteolysis. XPA is involved in recognising DNA damage and provides a scaffold for other repair factors to bind at the damage site.

Centrosome assembly 
HERC2 has been implicated in regulating stable centrosome architecture in conjunction with NEURL4 other ubiquitinated binding partners. Its absence is associated with aberrant centrosome morphology.

Iron metabolism 
HERC2 has recently been associated with regulating iron metabolism through ubiquitinating the F-box and leucine-rich repeat protein 5 (FBXL5) for proteasomal degradation. FBXL5 regulates the stability of the iron regulatory protein (IR2), which in turn controls the stability of proteins overlooking cellular iron homeostasis. Depletion of HERC2 results in decreased cellular iron levels. Iron is an essential nutrient in cells, but high levels can be cytotoxic, so maintaining cellular levels is important.

Other functions 
HERC2 helps to regulate p53 signalling by facilitating the oligomerization of p53, which is necessary for its transcriptional activity. Silencing of HERC2 reportedly inhibits the expression of genes regulated by p53 and also results in increased cellular growth.

Clinical significance 
The 15q11-q13 locus of HERC2 is also associated with Angelman syndrome (AS), specifically when a region of this locus is deleted. Similar to the rjs phenotype attributed to HERC2 in mice, AS is associated with seizures, developmental delay, intellectual disability and jerky movements. While a variety of disturbances to this locus can cause AS, all known mechanisms affect the functioning and expression of the E6AP E3 ligase, which also sits at this locus. HER2 is an allosteric activator of E6AP, and lies at the most commonly deleted region in AS. Its deletion could result in the inactivation of E6AP and consequently the development of AS.

In Old Order Amish families, a homozygous proline to leucine missense mutation within the first RLD domain has been implicated in a neurodevelopmental disorder with autism and features resembling AS. In addition, a homozygous deletion of both OCA2 and HERC2 genes was recently reported as presenting with severe developmental abnormalities. These phenotypes are suggestive of a role for HERC2 in normal neurodevelopment.

Certain alleles of HERC2 has recently been implicated in increasing the risk of iris cancer. Due its role in pigment determination, three HERC2 SNPs have been highlighted as associated with uveal melanoma. HERC2 frameshift mutations have also been described in colorectal cancers.

In accordance to its role in facilitating p53 oligomerization, HERC2 may be causally related to Li-Fraumeni syndrome and Li-Fraumeni-like syndromes, which occur in the absence of sufficient p53 oligomerization.

Interactions 
HERC2 is known to interact with the following:

 RNF8
 FBXL5
 OCA2
 UBC13
 USP20
 XPA 
 Claspin
 E6AP
 NEURL4
 RNF168
 BRCA1
 p53
 LRRK2

See also 

 Angelman Syndrome
 Eye color
 DNA repair pathways

References

Further reading 

 
 
 
 
 
 
 
 

Ligases